The Campbell whiptail,  kaiyomaru whiptail, or kaiyomaru rattail, Coelorinchus kaiyomaru, is a species of rattail found around the globe in the southern oceans, at depths of between 600 and 1,150 m.  Its length is between 20 and 40 cm.

References
 
 Tony Ayling & Geoffrey Cox, Collins Guide to the Sea Fishes of New Zealand,  (William Collins Publishers Ltd, Auckland, New Zealand 1982) 

Macrouridae
Taxa named by Takao Arai
Taxa named by Tomio Iwamoto
Fish described in 1979